Gilles Leger (born July 16, 1941 in Cornwall, Ontario) is a Pro Scout with the New York Rangers and a former professional ice hockey coach. Although a talented Canadian football player, Leger chose to dedicate his life to hockey. From 1967-72, he coached the St. Francis Xavier University squad before he was hired as an assistant coach with the Ottawa Nationals. He had brief head coaching stints Toronto Toros and Birmingham Bulls, then moving on to serve as general manager of the latter club. Leger has since held a series of front office jobs. From 1979 until 1983, he was the director of player development for the Quebec Nordiques. He then became president of the Fredericton Express and Halifax Citadels American Hockey League teams and the QMJHL Quebec Ramparts. He later severed as a scout for several NHL clubs, including the Edmonton Oilers and most recently the New York Rangers.

WHA coaching record

References

External links
 

1941 births
Canadian ice hockey coaches
Edmonton Oilers scouts
Ice hockey people from Ontario
Living people
New York Rangers scouts
Quebec Nordiques personnel
Sportspeople from Cornwall, Ontario
Toronto Toros